Benedict Osei (born 20 December 2004) is a Ghanaian professional footballer who plays as defender for Ghanaian Premier League side Bechem United F.C.

Career 
Osei started his professional career with Bechem United and was promoted to the senior team ahead of the 2020–21 season.  He made his debut on 11 November 2020, after coming on in the 75th minute for Caleb Asamoah in a 1–1 win over Liberty Professionals.

References

External links 

 

Living people
Association football midfielders
Ghanaian footballers
Bechem United F.C. players
2004 births